Jan Tománek (born 14 February 1978, Prague) is a Czech movie director, writer and artist. He is the creator of animated movies Goat Story – The Old Prague Legends and Goat Story with Cheese. Nowadays he is mostly writing books.

Biography
He graduated from the High School of Arts in Prague in 1996. He has been studying at the Academy of Fine Arts in Prague since 1999, in the studio of New Media. He has been making short 3D animated movies and combined movies with real actors since 1997. In 1997 he created his first short movie, Perpetuum mobile. In 1999 he produced two short acted movies and one 3D animated story about two living glasses. Since 2007 he has been working with Czech Television on his latest movie, which will be a combination of 3D modelled backgrounds with real actors shot on a blue background. He also works with Prague's Laterna Magika theatre company. Tománek's movies have been presented and awarded at Czech and foreign festivals. On his short films he does almost everything alone, including script, directing, animation and post-production.

In his Art And Animation studio, he produced in 2008 he released a new film project Goat Story – The Old Prague Legends – the first full-length Czech 3D animated movie. In 2012 he completed the sequel Goat story with Chesse – aka Goat Story 2. In 2009 Goat story became the most popular Czech animated movie ever.

Jan Tománek is writing books now. In 2018, he published his first novel Motýlí křik (The Butterfly scream) in the publishing house Albatros Media. In 2019 he wrote the book Lustr pro papeže (Chandelier for the Pope) – A true story from the hell of the communist normalization camps.

Since 2018, he has been writing mostly fiction.

He has two children, a son Jan and a daughter Zuzana.

Filmography

 Goat Story (2008) – The Old Prague Legends – feature film, director, artist
 Goat Story with Cheese (2012) – feature film, director, artist

Short movies
 1993 Balabanci - 8 min. - bedtime stories
 1997 Poslední večeře Páně (The Last dinner of Lord) – 3 min. – short film
 1997 Perpetuum mobile – 5 min. – short film
 1999 Kapesníček (The Hanky) – 6 min. – short film
 1999 Ze života sklenic (From the life of glasses) – 3 min. – 3D animation
 1999 Vlastně nikam... (Actually nowhere...) – 20 min – short film
 2000 Svět (The World) – 3 min. – 3D animation
 2001 Červená Karkulka – 5 min. – short film with animation
 2002 Žáby (The Frogs) – 4 min – 3D animation film, in the cinema distribution since 2003
 2003 Probuzení (Wake up) – 20 min – short film

Books
 Motýlí křik (2018) (The Butterfly scream) – The conspiracy thriller from present-day Prague and the Bilderberg conference.
 Lustr pro papeže (2019) (Chandelier for the Pope) – A true story from the hell of the communist normalization camps.
 Archa knih (2021) (Ark of Books) – The Real Truth Hides Between the Lines - Dystopian Novel (Albatros Media, XYZ)
 Válka se stromy (2022) (War with trees) – A bitterly parodic parable about a contemporary world that is getting more and more out of joint. (AAA studio)

Awards

2009 Digital seoul_film festival – Seoul
2009 Drake International film festival – Italy, Naples
2009 SICAF (Seoul International Cartoon & Animation Festival) (Feature competition)
2009 INDIE FEST USA – USA, California
2009 Bangkok Int. Animation Film Festival – Thailand, Bangkok (Official competition)
2009 Animest 2009 Int. Animation Film Festival – Bucharest (Official competition)
2009 CINANIMA 2009, 33rd Int. anim. Film Festival – Espino (Official competition)
2009 Czech Lion Award – Best Art Achievement – Nominee
2009 Febiofest – Kristian – AWARD Critics price – The Best Czech Animated movie 2008
2010 Bilbao – International Animation Film festival – Spain
2010 NUEVA MIRADA – Int. festival – Buenos Aires – Argentina – Golden kite – The best feature for children

References

External links
 Jan Tomanek – Personal web
 The Butterfly scream book web 
 film about a goat
 animation studio

1978 births
Living people
Academy of Fine Arts, Prague alumni
Czech writers
21st-century Czech novelists
Czech film directors
Artists from Prague